The 2012 WPA World Nine-ball Championship was a professional nine-ball pocket billiards (pool) championship, sanctioned by the World Pool-Billiard Association (WPA) and organised by Matchroom Sport. It was held from June 22 to 29 in Doha, Qatar, hosted by the Qatar Billiards and Snooker Federation. Qualifying tournaments were held from June 20 to 22, with the Al Sadd Sports Club hosting both qualifying and final tournaments.

British Darren Appleton won the championship defeating China's Li Hewen 13–12 in the final. It was Appleton's second world title after having won the 2008 10-ball World Championship and his first world title in 9-ball. Defending champion Yukio Akakariyama was defeated in the round of 32, by future champion Thorsten Hohmann. A total of US$276,000 in prize money was distributed for the tournament, with the World Champion receiving $40,000.

Format

The 128 participating players were divided into 16 groups, in which they competed in a double elimination tournamen against each other. The remaining 64 players in each group qualified for the final round played in the knockout system. The event was played under the  format.

Prize money
The event's prize money stayed similar to that of the previous years, with winner Darren Appleton winning $40,000.

Tournament summary
The event was played in the  format. In the event's semi-finals, Li Hewen defeated Germany's Ralf Souquet, 11–6, whereas Darren Appleton defeated Japan's Naoyuki Ōi 11–7. In the final, Appleton would take a heavy lead, moving to 9–2 in front, and later 11–3 in a race to 13. Li would make a comeback, to 12–6, before Appleton had the opportunity to win the tournament with an open table in the 19th rack. Appleton would Snooker himself with just four balls left on the table, and Li would win the next 6 racks to make the tournament reach a decisive rack.

Appleton would win the decisive frame, jump up onto the table, lifting his cue above his head. Appleton commented after the event that he was thinking "I can't lose, he needs a miracle" and, that at 12–10, he "started feeling the heat."

Finals

Grand Final

References

External links
Tournament at azbilliards.com

2012
WPA World Nine-ball Championship
WPA World Nine-ball Championship
International sports competitions hosted by Qatar
Sports competitions in Doha